Crackpots is an Atari 2600 game designed by Dan Kitchen and published by Activision in 1983. It was Kitchen's first game for Activision; he later did a number of ports to the 2600, including the arcade games Kung Fu Master and Double Dragon.

In Crackpots, the player controls Potsy, a gardener. Potsy's Brooklyn building is being overrun by bugs trying to climb inside six windows. The player moves Potsy back and forth along the roof to drop pots on the bugs before they can get close enough to enter the windows.

Gameplay
Each level consists of four waves of twelve bugs each; defeat all four waves and the player will move on to a more difficult and faster-paced level. Play then resumes until the building crumbles to the ground. If six or more bugs enter through the open windows, part of the building will be eaten away, and you will have to replay the level. The patterns vary for different colored bugs. Black bugs will move straight up the building, blue bugs wiggle from left to right, red bugs move diagonally, and green bugs zig-zag between windows.

Reception
A review in the November 1983 issue of Videogaming and Computer Gaming Illustrated stated, "I think Activision has finally  reached the point of saturation with the Kaboom! theme of having to catch or toss objects," but still gave the game a letter grade of B.

Legacy
Crackpots was included in the compilation packages Activision Classics (1998) for the PlayStation and the Activision Anthology (2002) for the PlayStation 2.

See also

List of Atari 2600 games
List of Activision games: 1980–1999

References

External links
Crackpots at Atari Mania
Crackpots at AtariAge

1983 video games
Activision games
Atari 2600 games
Atari 2600-only games
Fixed shooters
Video games about insects
Video games developed in the United States
Multiplayer and single-player video games